The trihydrogen cation or protonated molecular hydrogen is a cation (positive ion) with formula , consisting of three hydrogen nuclei (protons) sharing two electrons.

The trihydrogen cation is one of the most abundant ions in the universe. It is stable in the interstellar medium (ISM) due to the low temperature and low density of interstellar space. The role that  plays in the gas-phase chemistry of the ISM is unparalleled by any other molecular ion.

The trihydrogen cation is the simplest triatomic molecule, because its two electrons are the only valence electrons in the system. It is also the simplest example of a three-center two-electron bond system.

History
 was first discovered by J. J. Thomson in 1911. While studying the resultant species of plasma discharges, he discovered something very odd. Using an early form of mass spectrometry, he discovered a large abundance of a molecular ion with a mass-to-charge ratio of 3.

The formation pathway was discovered by Hogness & Lunn in 1925. They also used an early form of mass spectrometry to study hydrogen discharges. They found that as the pressure of hydrogen increased, the amount of  increased linearly and the amount of  decreased linearly. In addition, there was little H+ at any pressure. These data suggested the proton exchange formation pathway discussed below.

In 1961, Martin et al. first suggested that  may be present in interstellar space given the large amount of hydrogen in interstellar space and its reaction pathway was exothermic (~1.5 eV). This led to the suggestion of Watson and Herbst & Klemperer in 1973 that  is responsible for the formation of many observed molecular ions.

This started the search for extraterrestrial . Emission lines were detected in the late 1980s and early 1990s in the ionospheres of Jupiter, Saturn, and Uranus. In the textbook by Bunker and Jensen Figure 1.1 reproduces part of the ν2 emission band from a region of auroral activity in the upper atmosphere of Jupiter,
 
and its Table 12.3 lists the transition wavenumbers of 
the lines in the band observed by Oka with their assignments.

In 1996,  was finally detected in the interstellar medium (ISM) by Geballe & Oka in two molecular interstellar clouds in the sightlines GL2136 and W33A. In 1998,  was unexpectedly detected by McCall et al. in a diffuse interstellar cloud in the sightline Cygnus OB2#12. In 2006 Oka announced that  was ubiquitous in interstellar medium, and that the Central Molecular Zone contained a million times the concentration of ISM generally.

Structure

The three hydrogen atoms in the molecule form an equilateral triangle, with a bond length of 0.90 Å on each side. The bonding among the atoms is a three-center two-electron bond, a delocalized resonance hybrid type of structure. The strength of the bond has been calculated to be around 4.5 eV (104 kcal/mol).

Isotopologues
In theory, the cation has 10 isotopologues, resulting from the replacement of one or more protons by nuclei of the other hydrogen isotopes; namely, deuterium nuclei (deuterons) or tritium nuclei (tritons). Some of them have been detected in interstellar clouds. They differ in the atomic mass number A and the number of neutrons N:

 =  (A=3, N=0) (the common one).
 =  (A=4, N=1) (deuterium dihydrogen cation).
 =  (A=5, N=2) (dideuterium hydrogen cation).
 =  (A=6, N=3) (trideuterium cation).
 =  (A=5, N=2) (tritium dihydrogen cation).
 =  (A=6, N=3) (tritium deuterium hydrogen cation).
 =  (A=7, N=4) (tritium dideuterium cation).
 =  (A=7, N=4) (ditritium hydrogen cation).
 =  (A=8, N=5) (ditritium deuterium cation).
 =  (A=9, N=6) (tritritium cation).

The deuterium isotopologues have been implicated in the fractionation of deuterium in dense interstellar cloud cores.

Formation
H2+ + H2 -> H3+ + H

H2{} + cosmic\ ray -> H2+{} + e^-{} + cosmic\ ray

The cosmic ray has so much energy, it is almost unaffected by the relatively small energy transferred to the hydrogen when ionizing an H2 molecule. In laboratories,  is produced by the same mechanism in plasma discharge cells, with the discharge potential providing the energy to ionize the H2.

Destruction
The information for this section was also from a paper by Eric Herbst. The dominant destruction pathway in dense interstellar clouds is by proton transfer with a neutral collision partner. The most likely candidate for a destructive collision partner is the second most abundant molecule in space, CO.
H3+ + CO -> HCO+ + H2

The significant product of this reaction is HCO+, an important molecule for interstellar chemistry. Its strong dipole and high abundance make it easily detectable by radioastronomy.  can also react with atomic oxygen to form OH+ and H2.
H3+ + O -> OH+ + H2

OH+ then usually reacts with more H2 to create further hydrogenated molecules.

Different experiments have suggested that water is created anywhere from 5–33% of the time. Water formation on grains is still considered the primary source of water in the interstellar medium.

This reaction has multiple products. The major product is dissociation into three hydrogen atoms, which occurs roughly 75% of the time. The minor product is H2 and H, which occurs roughly 25% of the time.

Ortho/Para-H3+

The protons of  can be in two different spin configurations, called ortho and para. Ortho- has all three proton spins parallel, yielding a total nuclear spin of 3/2. Para- has two proton spins parallel while the other is anti-parallel, yielding a total nuclear spin of 1/2.

When a  molecule collides with a H2 molecule, a proton transfer can take place. The transfer still yields a  molecule and a H2 molecule, but can potentially change the total nuclear spin of the two molecules depending on the nuclear spins of the protons. When an ortho- and a para-H2 collide, the result may be a para- and an ortho-H2.

Spectroscopy
The pure rotational spectrum is exceedingly weak. Ultraviolet light is too energetic and would dissociate the molecule. Rovibronic (infrared) spectroscopy provides the ability to observe . Since Oka's initial spectrum, over 900 absorption lines have been detected in the infrared region.  emission lines have also been found by observing the atmospheres of the Jovian planets.  emission lines are found by observing molecular hydrogen and finding a line that cannot be attributed to molecular hydrogen.

Astronomical detection
 has been detected in two types of celestial environments: Jovian planets and interstellar clouds. In Jovian planets, it has been detected in the planet's ionospheres, the region where the Sun's high energy radiation ionizes the particles in the atmosphere.

Planetary atmospheres
The detection of the first  emission lines was reported in 1989 by Drossart et al., found in the ionosphere of Jupiter. Drossart found a total of 23  lines with a column density of 1.39/cm2. In 1993,  was found in Saturn by Geballe et al. and in Uranus by Trafton et al.

Molecular interstellar clouds
Since then,  has been detected in numerous other molecular cloud sightlines, such as AFGL 2136, Mon R2 IRS 3, GCS 3–2, GC IRS 3, and LkHα 101.

Diffuse interstellar clouds
Unexpectedly, three  lines were detected in 1998 by McCall et al. in the diffuse cloud sightline of Cyg OB2 No. 12. McCall detected a temperature of ~ and a column density of ~1014/cm2, the same column density as Geballe & Oka. Since then,  has been detected in many other diffuse cloud sightlines, such as GCS 3–2, GC IRS 3, and ζ Persei.

Steady-state model predictions
In dense clouds, proton transfer with CO is the dominating destruction mechanism. This corresponds to a predicted number density of 10−4 cm−3 in dense clouds.

In diffuse clouds, the dominating destruction mechanism is dissociative recombination. This corresponds to a predicted number density of 10−6/cm3 in diffuse clouds. Therefore, since column densities for diffuse and dense clouds are roughly the same order of magnitude, diffuse clouds must have a path length 100 times greater than that for dense clouds. Therefore, by using  as a probe of these clouds, their relative sizes can be determined.

See also
Dihydrogen cation, 
Helium hydride ion,

References

External links
 Resource Center
The UMIST Database for Astrochemistry 2012 / astrochemistry.net
 , NIST Chemistry WebBook

Astrochemistry
Cations
Cyclic compounds
Hydrogen physics